Veerappen Veerathan (known as V. Veerappen) is a Malaysian lawyer and politician. He is well known for founding the Parti Gerakan Rakyat Malaysia (Gerakan) together with Dr. Lim Chong Eu, Dr. Tan Chee Khoon and Dr. Syed Hussein Alatas. In 1972, he left Gerakan and founded the new party Parti Keadilan Masyarakat Malaysia (PEKEMAS).

Politic career
He was an elected Member of Parliament of South Seberang Perai in 1959 and 1969 respectively on Socialist Front (SF) and Gerakan tickets.

Election Result
 P033 -Seberang Selatan
 1959 - Won
 1964 - Loss
 1969 - Won

References

Malaysian politicians of Indian descent
Malaysian political party founders
Workers' rights activists
Parti Gerakan Rakyat Malaysia politicians
Labour Party of Malaya politicians
Malaysian socialists
Members of the Dewan Rakyat
Members of the Penang State Legislative Assembly
Year of birth missing (living people)
Living people
Place of birth missing (living people)